Buck Clayton Jams Benny Goodman is an album by trumpeter Buck Clayton performing tunes associated with Benny Goodman. The album was recorded in 1953 and 1954 and released by Columbia.

Track listing
 "Christopher Columbus" (Chu Berry, Andy Razaf) – 25:46	
 "Don't Be That Way" (Benny Goodman, Edgar Sampson) – 9:26	
 "Undecided" (Sid Robin, Charlie Shavers) – 9:30
Recorded in NYC on December 16, 1953 (track 1) and August 13, 1954 (tracks 2 & 3)

Personnel
Buck Clayton – trumpet
Joe Newman – trumpet
Henderson Chambers (track 1), Urbie Green, Trummy Young (tracks 2 & 3) – trombone
Lem Davis – alto saxophone
Julian Dash (track 1), Coleman Hawkins (tracks 2 & 3) – tenor saxophone
Charles Fowlkes – baritone saxophone 
Billy Kyle (tracks 2 & 3), Sir Charles Thompson (track 1) – piano, celeste 
Freddie Green – guitar
Milt Hinton (tracks 2 & 3), Walter Page (track 1) – double bass
Jo Jones – drums

References

1955 albums
Buck Clayton albums
Columbia Records albums
Benny Goodman tribute albums
Albums produced by George Avakian